Tinton is a ghost town in the Black Hills of Lawrence County, South Dakota, United States. It started out as a gold mining camp and later began to produce tin.

History
The area was first settled in 1876 by Edgar St. John, who lived in the town until his death in 1928. That same year, tin was discovered in the area in placer deposits. In 1879, large gold deposits were found in Negro Hill, just south of the present-day town site. This discovery caused the first boom of the area. In 1884, tin was discovered within pegmatite rock, furthering the development of the area and converting the operation from gold to tin. A mining company known as the Tinton Company had built Tinton by 1904. The town had a post office, bank, mill, two-room schoolhouse, hotel, Black Hills Tin Company store and office, assembly hall, weekly newspaper, and six houses for miners and their families. At least 14 more houses were added over the years. It was once proposed that a railroad be built to the town from Iron Creek in Spearfish Canyon, but this was never accomplished.  of tin had been mined from the Rough and Ready Mine alone by 1911.

From there, production began to decline, but continued in short bursts of activity until the 1950s. Other mining operations in the area were also very successful. In the 1930s, a sawmill was built due to the declining success of the town's mining operations. During World War II, the mine began producing feldspar and lithium. These gradual changes in operation to less valuable resources contributed to the decline of Tinton. Over several years, other companies took ownership of the town, including The American Tin Plate Company, The Boston Tin Company, The Black Hills Tin Mining Company, and The Tinton Reduction Company. The town was abandoned after a fire destroyed the mill in the 1950s. While many structures are still standing, several have collapsed, and there is no glass in the windows. Today, the town is managed by the mining company Tinton Enterprises. The mines are now back in operation, providing tantalum.

Geography
Tinton is located at the back of Spearfish Canyon in the Black Hills in Lawrence County. Main Street runs down the Wyoming-South Dakota state line, but the town is most widely accepted to be inside Lawrence County. It is approximately six miles west of Iron Creek. The town is set up on a hill and overlooks the valleys to the east and west, which are full of mines. Several other ghost towns are located nearby.

Notable residents
 "Potato Creek" Johnny Perrett, a notable Black Hills pioneer

References

1876 establishments in Dakota Territory
Geography of Lawrence County, South Dakota
Ghost towns in South Dakota
Populated places established in 1876
Mining communities in South Dakota